Brian Edward O'Connor (born February 14, 1953), known professionally as Brian Brucker O'Connor or Brian O'Connor, is an American actor, comedian and guidance counselor. His best known roles include Biddle in Beverly Hills Cop II (1987) and Schemer on Shining Time Station (1989–1993). O’Connor briefly reprised his role as Schemer in a 2020 parody of Thomas and the Magic Railroad entitled “The Magic Railroad Parody” which aired exclusively on YouTube.

Career
O'Connor graduated from the University of Massachusetts  in 1975 to pursue a career in acting. Arriving in Boston, he co-founded the comedy troupe Slap Happy, along with fellow UMass alum Allan Jacobs. Joined by Jeff Ernstoff and Jan Kirschner, the group toured the nation and reached over 200 universities, receiving critical praise for performances in Boston, Cambridge and New York City. During the Slap Happy tour, O'Connor participated in a Ford's Theatre production of the Andrew Lloyd Webber musical Joseph and the Amazing Technicolor Dreamcoat.

O'Connor made his onscreen debut with the recorded-live sketch comedy special National Lampoon's Class of '86 (1986). He followed this with a guest appearance on Miami Vice and his feature film debut in Beverly Hills Cop II (1987) as Biddle. He returned to New York in 1988 to perform a one-man show ("One Hour Out of Your Life") at the Judith Anderson Theatre, earning praise from The New York Times''' Stephen Holden.

In 1989, O'Connor was cast as Horace Schemer on Shining Time Station (1989–1993); the character, known commonly as "Schemer", proved to be his signature role. The roguish and clumsy, but still caring, character quickly grew in popularity with audiences. Since the show's cancellation, O'Connor has made numerous public appearances as Schemer.

Following his appearance in the indie comedy film Terrorists (2004), Mr. O'Connor performed in the 2005 Geva Theatre Center production of the solo play The Race of the Ark Tattoo. Shortly thereafter, he went back to school to become certified as a children's guidance counselor.

In 2016, O'Connor became the vocalist and co-guitarist for independent band The 6660s.

Personal life
O'Connor was born into a Roman Catholic family of Irish descent, the third of five children. He was married for seven years to actress Jane Brucker, best known for portraying Lisa Houseman in Dirty Dancing (1987); they have a daughter, Sally (born 1989). O'Connor and Brucker appeared in the same 1986 episode of Miami Vice'' ("Baby Blues"), although their characters did not share scenes.

Filmography

Film

Television

References

External links

1953 births
Living people
American male film actors
American male stage actors
American male television actors
People from Lynnfield, Massachusetts
Male actors from Massachusetts
20th-century American male actors
21st-century American male actors
University of Massachusetts alumni